The Sacro Monte di Crea (literally "Sacred Mountain of Crea", although it is built on a hill rather than a mountain) is a Roman Catholic sanctuary in the comune of Serralunga di Crea, Piedmont, northern Italy. It is reached via a steeply ascending route which winds through a wooded natural park, whose flora was catalogued by the Casalese photographer and polymath Francesco Negri.

History 
Construction began in 1589, around an existing sanctuary dedicated to the Virgin Mary whose creation is traditionally attributed to Saint Eusebius of Vercelli, around 350 AD. Eusebius is also said to have installed the statue of the Madonna which is still venerated in the sanctuary.

The chapels dedicated to the Mysteries of the Rosary were positioned around the one-thousand-year-old Marian sanctuary on the highest of the hills of Basso Monferrato. As time passed the initial scheme of the monumental layout was altered on a number of occasions and in 1820 significant restoration work began after its partial destruction.

The park
Since 1980, woods and a few agricultural land surrounding the Sacro Monte have been preserved as the Parco naturale del Sacro Monte di Crea, whose area is  where visitors can admire some plant species no longer widely found elsewhere.

References

External links

Sacro Monte di Crea 
Official website 
Official web site for European Sacred Mounts 
MonferratoArte: Crea  from a historical and bibliographical directory of artists active in the extra-urban Churches of the Diocese of Casale Monferrato.

World Heritage Sites in Italy
Buildings and structures in Piedmont
Crea
Churches in the province of Alessandria